The 1997–98 snooker season was a series of snooker tournaments played between August 1997 and May 1998. The following table outlines the results for ranking events and the invitational events. This was the first season since 1987–88 that Stephen Hendry failed to win at least one Triple Crown title, although he did reach two of the three Triple Crown finals.


Calendar

Official rankings 

The top 16 of the world rankings, these players automatically played in the final rounds of the world ranking events and were invited for the Masters.

Notes

References

External links

1997
Season 1998
Season 1997